Steve "Junna" Jones (19 October 1951 – 9 September 2007) was a Welsh rugby union hooker, who played club rugby for Pontypool RFC and Newport RFC in the 1970s and 80s. He often played in a front row partnership with Staff Jones and Graham Price at Pontypool RFC and was part of the 1983 Pontypool side to win the Schweppes Cup. Although he toured with a Welsh XV to Canada in 1980, the game did not grant the Welsh players any caps.

Jones learnt his rugby under the tutelage of Laurie Daniel who was a former Welsh international who played for Pontypool and Newport. He later turned to coaching and in the 1996/97 season became the first full-time coach of Newport.

In 1999, Jones became head coach at Pontypool and revitalised the club, signing experienced players such as Byron Hayward, Mark Jones and Kuli Faletau. Steve coached Pontypool to second place in the Welsh Division 1 in season 2001/2. In 2002/3 he coached Pontypool to the league championship, losing only 4 games in the process.

In September 2005, he left Pontypool RFC to take up the coaching role at Newbridge.

Jones died suddenly on 9 September 2007 aged 55.

A memorial match between Newbridge legends and Pontypool legends was played on Thursday 27 December 2007. The game attracted a crowd of around 3,000 with famous former players such as Eddie Butler, David Bishop and Byron Hayward all taking part. Newbridge won the match 26–17.

External links
 Newport RFC player profiles

1951 births
2007 deaths
Rugby union hookers
Welsh rugby union coaches
Welsh rugby union players
Newport RFC players
Pontypool RFC players